Maya Memsaab (also known as Maya and Maya: The Enchanting Illusion in English) is a 1993 Indian mystery drama film directed by Ketan Mehta and starring Deepa Sahi, Farooq Shaikh, Raj Babbar, Shah Rukh Khan, and Paresh Rawal. The film is based on the famous Gustave Flaubert's 1857 novel Madame Bovary. Maya Memsaab won the National Film Award – Special Mention (Feature Film) in the year 1993. The rights of this film are now owned by Shah Rukh Khan's Red Chillies Entertainment.

Synopsis

Young, beautiful and intelligent Maya (Deepa Sahi) lives with her father in a palatial mansion in rural India. When her father suffers a stroke, she calls for local Dr. Charu Das, who arrives on his bicycle and prescribes treatment for her father. He comes often, more on the pretext of seeing her than her father. Eventually, they get married. Years pass by and Charu is engrossed in treating patients, leaving Maya alone to reflect on her own fate and life. And it is not long before a young man named Rudra enters her life and an affair follows. This does not last long, as a much younger man Lalit (Shah Rukh Khan) now enters her life and they begin a passionate affair. But again, Maya is not satisfied as she longs for more than carnal needs. All the time, this bored housewife gets attracted to costly objects and spends recklessly on clothes and furniture, even if she has to borrow money. She mortgages her house to Lalaji. Finally, reality catches up with her. Lalaji brings a court order to take possession of her house. Rudra and Lalit desert her and this leads her to drink a mystical drink that was earlier being advertised on the streets to give you one wish on the condition you had a pure heart. The drink causes her to flash brightly and disappear. This leaves two investigators to probe who or what really killed Maya.

Cast
Deepa Sahi as Maya
Farooq Shaikh as Dr. Charu Das
Raj Babbar as Rudra Pratap Singh
Shahrukh Khan as Lalit
Paresh Rawal as Lalaji
Shrivallabh Vyas and Deven Bhojani as Detectives
Shreeram Lagoo as Maya's father
Raghubir Yadav as The mentally sick street-beggar
Sudha Shivpuri
Rajesh Vivek
Farah as Chhaya
Om Puri

Soundtrack

References

External links
 
 Maya Memsaab Full Movie

1993 films
1990s Hindi-language films
Films based on Madame Bovary
Films directed by Ketan Mehta
Indian erotic drama films
Erotic mystery films
1990s erotic drama films
1993 drama films
Films scored by Hridaynath Mangeshkar